Olesya is a 1971 drama film directed by Boris Ivchenko based on a screenplay by Vasily Dulgerov. Adapted from the Aleksandr Kuprin's 1898 homonymous novel.

Plot
Wandering through the forest, Ivan Timofeyevich finds a dilapidated hut on the edge of the swamp. There lives an old woman with her beautiful granddaughter Olesya. Many years prior, the local peasants, considering the woman a witch, burned down her house, killing her daughter. Olesya is fascinated by Ivan, who is in turn conquered by the power of the girl's feelings, by her openness and the purity of her soul. Eventually, he falls in love with Olesya. However, she foresees a quick separation.

Cast
 Lyudmila Chursina as Olesya
 Gennady Voropayev as Ivan Timofeyevich
 Boryslav Brondukov as Yarmola
 Anatoly Barchuk  as Dmitro  
 Maria Kapnist  as Manuylikha, Olesya's grandmother
 Vladimir Volkov as Yevtikhiy Petrovich
 Boris Aleksandrov as Selyanin (as B. Aleksandrov)
 Yuri Gavrilyuk
 Fyodor Gladkov
 Anatoliy Ivanov

Release 
Boris Ivchenko's film takes the 616th place in the list of the highest-grossing films of the Soviet film distribution. It was watched by 25,1 million viewers.

See also
 La Sorcière (film)

References

External links 
 

Soviet drama films
1971 drama films
Dovzhenko Film Studios films
Adaptations of works by Aleksandr Kuprin
Films set in Russia